Catalysis Letters is a peer-reviewed scientific journal covering research on catalysis in a wide range of sub-disciplines such as homogeneous, heterogeneous and enzymatic catalysis. It was previously published by Baltzer Science Publishers, which was then sold to Wolters Kluwer (which later became Springer Science+Business Media).

References

External links 
 

Chemistry journals
Publications established in 1988
Springer Science+Business Media academic journals
English-language journals
Biweekly journals